= Operation Lowrider =

American surveillance program

- Date: 2011 – present
- Location: Mexico
- Also known as: Northern Command Aerial Sensor Platform
- Type: Surveillance program
- Organised by: United States Northern Command (contracting private entities)
- Outcome: Ongoing

Operation Lowrider, known officially as the Northern Command Aerial Sensor Platform is an American surveillance program intended to aid in combat against Mexican drug cartels, in effect since 2011. While the United States has long aided the Mexican government, the program marks a shift in US tactics.

Re-purposing techniques and equipment honed in the conflicts in Iraq and Afghanistan, Lowrider employs manned, single engine surveillance planes that track the day-to-day movements of cartel personnel. The program created controversy as it employs private contractors to conduct surveillance, contracts awarded without bidding. The use of manned, single engine surveillance planes is also considered a dangerous risk, since the failure of the one engine could strand a pilot in the Mexican wilderness. The future of the program is in question due to Mexican President, Enrique Peña Nieto's desire to disengage his country's intelligence agency from that of the United States.
